This is an annual football competition played by teams from Sydney, Australia based boys high schools who are members of the AAGPS

History
The official football competition commenced in 1988
 1st Grade The Wanderers' Cup for AAGPS Soccer presented in 1988 by The King's School to mark the first school-based game of Soccer in Australia between The King's School and The Gentlemen Wanderers played in Parramatta on 14 August 1880.
 2nd Grade GPS 2nd Soccer XI Premiership first awarded in 1988.

Results

1988 to 1999

Year 2000 onwards

 2012 marked the 25th anniversary of AAGPS Football with St Joseph's College repeating the same feat that they achieved in the very first season of AAGPS in 1988, that is, taking out both the First and Seconds Competitions.

See also
 Athletic Association of the Great Public Schools of New South Wales
 AAGPS (NSW) Rugby
 AAGPS (NSW) Basketball
 Head of the River (New South Wales)

References

 GPS Results Archive

External links
 GPS website

Athletic Association of the Great Public Schools of New South Wales
Sport in New South Wales
Private schools in New South Wales
Sports competitions in Sydney